Fazel in Persian, or Fadhel is an Arabic and Persian male given and also surname meaning "virtuous".

It may refer to:

Michael Fadel (1710-1795), Maronite Patriarch of Antioch
Fazel Darbandi (died 1869/1870), Iranian Shia cleric and scholar
Mustafa Fazl Pasha (1830–1875), Ottoman Egyptian prince
Muhammad Fadhel al-Jamali (1903–1997), Iraqi politician
Fazıl Küçük (1906–1984), Vice President of the Republic of Cyprus
Mounir Abou Fadel (1912–1987), political figure in Lebanon
Mohammad Fazel Lankarani (1931—2007), Iranian Islamic cleric
Iradj Fazel (born 1939), Iranian surgeon and academic
Fadhil Al Azzawi (born 1940), Iraqi writer
Mohamed Fadel Ismail Ould Es-Sweyih (c. 1950–2002), Sahrawi nationalist politician, member of the Polisario Front 
Fazel Maleki (born 1953), Iraqi Twelver Shi'a Marja
Fadel Benyaich (born 1953), member of the royal cabinet of Morocco
Fadhil Abbas al-Ka'bi (born 1955), Iraqi children's writer and poet
Abdullah Mohamed Fadil (died 1991), Somali soldier
Fadhil Jalil al-Barwari (born 1966), Iraqi military commander
Fazul Abdullah Mohammed (c. 1973–2011), al-Qaeda leader in East Africa
Mohamed Fadel Fahmy, or Mohamed Fahmy (born 1974), Egyptian-born Canadian journalist and author
Fadhel Al-Matrook (1979–2011), Bahraini killed as in Death of Fadhel Al-Matrook
Abbas Fahdel, Iraqi-French film director, screenwriter and film critic
Hussain Fadhel (born 1984), Kuwaiti footballer
Fadel Ahmad (born 1985), UAE footballer
Ali Bahjat Fadhil (born 1992), Iraqi footballer
Ahmad Fadhel, (born 1992), Iraqi footballer
Mohamed Kamal Fadel, Polisario Front representative to Australia & New Zealand

Places 
 Deh Fazel, Iran
 Kalateh-ye Fazel, Iran

Arabic masculine given names